The 2023 Saudi Arabian Grand Prix (officially known as the Formula 1 STC Saudi Arabian Grand Prix 2023) was a Formula One motor race that was held on 19 March 2023 at the Jeddah Corniche Circuit in Jeddah, Saudi Arabia.

Background
The event was held across the weekend of the 17–19 March. It was the second round of the 2023 Formula One World Championship.

Championship standings before the race
Going into the weekend, Max Verstappen led the World Drivers' Championship with 25 points, 7 points from his teammate Sergio Pérez, second, and 10 from Fernando Alonso, third. Red Bull Racing led the Constructors' Championship from Aston Martin by 20 points and Mercedes by 27 points.

Entrants

The drivers and teams were the same as the season entry list with no additional stand-in drivers for the race.

Tyre choices

Tyre supplier Pirelli brought the C2, C3, and C4 tyre compounds (designated hard, medium, and soft, respectively) for teams to use at the event.

Track changes 
Turns 22 and 23 were tightened and the walls were moved back at several corners, due to safety concerns relating to fast, blind corners. Kerbing was also altered to improve safety. Additionally, the third DRS detection point was moved farther ahead, being positioned on the exit of turn 27. As a result, the third DRS activation point was moved farther ahead, being positioned  after turn 27. Changes to the DRS zones were made in response to dangerous tactics employed at previous editions of the Grand Prix, where drivers would brake erratically for turn 27, in order to fall behind the opposition and gain the advantage of DRS.

Practice 
Three free practice sessions were held prior to qualifying, two on Friday and one on Saturday afternoon.

The first practice session ended with Red Bull Racing's Max Verstappen setting the fastest time ahead of his teammate Sergio Pérez and Aston Martin's Fernando Alonso. His teammate Lance Stroll and Mercedes' George Russell capped off the top five.

The second practice session saw Alonso split the Red Bull pairing of Verstappen and Pérez, ahead of Esteban Ocon and Russell.

The third and final practice session ended with Verstappen and Pérez on top again ahead of the Aston Martin pairing, with Lewis Hamilton completing the top five.

Qualifying

Qualifying report 
Qualifying was held on 18 March 2023 at 20:00 local time (UTC+3). 

The first segment ended with Yuki Tsunoda, Alexander Albon, Nyck De Vries, Lando Norris and Logan Sargeant setting the five slowest times resulting in their elimination. Norris broke the front-left suspension of his car through hitting a wall during his second timed lap, while Sargeant first had a lap time deleted for a track limit violation, spun on his second attempt to set a meaningful lap time and finally had to park his car trackside following a mechanical failure during his final attempt. This left him without a lap time within 107% of the fastest Q1 time, Sargeant was permitted to race by the stewards.

During the second segment Verstappen's car suddenly slowed down while trying to set his first fast lap. He was able to limp back to the pits, but what was later identified as a driveshaft failure prevented him from taking part in qualifying any further and this left him in 15th place. Nico Hülkenberg, Kevin Magnussen, Valtteri Bottas and Zhou Guanyu were eliminated alonsgside him.

During the final segment Pérez set the fastest time, taking his second career pole position. Leclerc set the second fastest time, but would start twelfe after the application of his penalty. Alonso set the third fastest time ahead of Mercedes' Russell. Carlos Sainz Jr. posted the fifth time in the second Ferrari ahead of Stroll and Ocon. Hamilton, Oscar Piastri and Pierre Gasly completed the top ten.

Qualifying classification 

Notes
  – Charles Leclerc received a ten-place grid penalty for exceeding his quota of control electronics elements.
  – Logan Sargeant failed to set a time within the 107% requirement. He was permitted to race at the stewards' discretion.

Race

Race report 
The race was held on 19 March 2023 at 20:00 local time (UTC+3).

After the formation lap, Alonso lined up with slightly left of his grid slot, for which he was given a five-second time penalty. He served the penalty at the scheduled pit stop. Alonso led the first three laps of the race; Pérez soon passed him to take the lead of the race. On lap 16, Stroll retired due to engine failure, bringing out a safety car. Soon after the restart, Verstappen, who had started in fifteenth, fought his way through the field to eventually take second place behind Pérez, who retained the lead all the way to the final lap. Albon retired on lap 27 due to brake problems. Alonso's third-place finish made him the sixth driver to have scored 100 podiums in his Formula One career.

Post-race 
After the race, Alonso was further penalised due to not serving the first penalty correctly at his pit stop. The rules state that, when the driver makes a pit-stop, the penalty must be served before any work can begin on the car - during Alonso's pitstop, the rear jack made contact with the car before the five seconds were over. The ten-second penalty he received would have dropped him to fourth behind Russell. Aston Martin exercised their right to have the penalty reviewed, after which it was overturned, with the stewards citing that there is no clear agreemen [...] that a jack touching a car would amount to working on the car”. A subsequent statement from an FIA spokesperson mentioned "conflicting precedents". Alonso criticised the FIA for its delayed response, having been informed of his penalty after the podium celebrations; Russell criticised the penalties as being "too extreme". The FIA is due to clarify what constitues working on the car before the third round, the Australian Grand Prix.

Race classification 

Notes
  – Includes one point for fastest lap.

Championship standings after the race

Drivers' Championship standings

Constructors' Championship standings

 Note: Only the top five positions are included for both sets of standings.

See also 
 2023 Jeddah Formula 2 round

References

External links

Saudi Arabian
Saudi Arabian Grand Prix
Saudi Arabian Grand Prix
2023
Grand Prix